Abun, also known as Yimbun, Anden, Manif, or Karon Pantai, is a Papuan language spoken by the Abun people along the northern coast of the Bird's Head Peninsula in Sausapor District, Tambrauw Regency. It is not closely related to any other language, and though Ross (2005) assigned it to the West Papuan family, based on similarities in pronouns, Palmer (2018), Ethnologue, and Glottolog list it as a language isolate.

Abun used to have three lexical tones, but only two are distinguished now as minimal pairs and even these are found in limited vocabulary. Therefore, Abun is said to be losing its tonality due to linguistic change.

Being spoken along the coast of northwestern New Guinea, Abun is in contact with Austronesian languages; maritime vocabulary in Abun has been borrowed from Biak.

Setting and dialects 
The speakers number about 3,000 spread across 18 villages and several isolated hamlets. The Abun area occupies a stretch of the northern coast of the Bird's Head Peninsula. The neighbouring languages are Moi to the southwest along the coast, Moraid and Karon Dori to the south (the latter is a dialect of Maybrat), and Mpur to the east.

The Abun speakers refer to their language as either Abun or Anden. Several other names are in use by neighbouring groups: the Moi call it Madik, the Mpur refer to it as Yimbun or  Yembun, while among the  it is known as Karon Pantai, a term with derogatory connotations.

Abun has four distinct dialects: Abun Tat, Abun Ye, and the two dialects of Abun Ji. The two Abun Ji dialects are differentiated by their use of /r/ or /l/. Abun exists on a dialect continuum from Abun Tat to Abun Ji /l/: speakers of Abun Tat are less able to understand Abun Ji than Abun Ye.

Phonology 
Abun has 5 vowels: /i, e, ɑ, o, u/.

Tones
Abun has three lexical tones, which are high, mid, and low. A minimal set showing all three tones:

High/rising tones can also be used to mark plurals (Berry & Berry 1999:21).

ndam ‘bird’, ndám ‘birds’
nu ‘house’, nú ‘houses’
gwa ‘taro tuber’, gwá ‘taro tubers’

Grammar
Abun has bipartite negation like French, using the pre-predicate negator yo and post-predicate negator nde. Both are obligatory. Example:

Like the other language isolates of the northern Bird's Head Peninsula, Abun is a heavily isolating language, with many one-to-one word-morpheme correspondences, as shown in the example sentence below.

Vocabulary comparison
The following basic vocabulary words are from Miedema & Welling (1985) and Voorhoeve (1975), as cited in the Trans-New Guinea database:

{| class="wikitable sortable"
! gloss !! Abun (Karon Pantai dialect) !! Abun (Senopi dialect) !! Abun (Jembun dialect)
|-
! head
| məsu || tana || mesu
|-
! hair
| go || mauwyan || usugo
|-
! eye
| ŋgro || tasu || da
|-
! tooth
| sios || jasièm || mesos
|-
! leg
| kwes || taow || mengwès
|-
! louse
| mim || xatè || 
|-
! dog
| ndar || (n)dax || dar
|-
! pig
| yot || fani || nox; yot
|-
! bird
| namgau || eruː || daːm
|-
! egg
| bem || yayuf || beːm
|-
! blood
| nde || mès || dè
|-
! bone
| dini || tey || diniéː
|-
! skin
| da || tarak || menda
|-
! tree
| kew || ara || key
|-
! man
| bris || raysmiː || yeːtu
|-
! sun
| kam || ayom || kaːm
|-
! water
| sur || aya || sur
|-
! fire
| bot || tafox || boːt
|-
! stone
| jok || fra || yok
|-
! name
| gum || tasom || tagum
|-
! eat
| git || téyt || mengi
|-
! one
| dik || sow || dik
|-
! two
| we || ai || wè
|}

References

Sources

External links
 A sample of Abun from Global Recordings Network
 Abun languages on TransNewGuinea.org

West and Central Bird's Head languages
Languages of western New Guinea
Tonal languages